Bissolati is a surname. Notable people with the surname include:

Elena Bissolati (born 1997), Italian racing cyclist
Leonida Bissolati (1857–1920), Italian politician